This is a list of fictional princesses that have appeared in various works of fiction. This list is organized by medium and limited to well-referenced, notable examples of fictional princesses.

Literature

This section contains examples of both classic and more modern writing.

Comics

Theatre

Film

Live action

Animated

Disney

Other

Television

Live action

Animated

Radio

Video games

Web

See also
Princess and dragon
List of fictional princes
List of fictional monarchs (fictional countries)
List of fictional nobility

References

 
Fictional
Princesses
Princesses